Estadio Juan Carlos Durán is a multi-use stadium in Santa Cruz de la Sierra, Bolivia.  It is currently used mostly for football matches, on club level by Real Santa Cruz. The stadium has a capacity of 25,000 spectators.

References

Football venues in Santa Cruz de la Sierra
Buildings and structures in Santa Cruz Department (Bolivia)